McGavick is a surname. Notable people with the surname include:

Alexander Joseph McGavick (1863–1948), American Catholic clergyman
Mike McGavick (born 1958), American businessman